The flare is an acrobatic move in which the performer alternates balancing the torso between either arm while swinging the legs beneath in continuous circles. It is a fundamental b-boying/bgirl power move, and in gymnastics it may be performed on a pommel horse or during the floor exercise. The move is commonly spelled flair in gymnastics and further may be called a "Thomas flair" after its originator, Kurt Thomas.

Step by step
The description assumes counter-clockwise rotation
The left leg begins about 10 inches behind the right (not lined up). If the breaker already has momentum, he/she quickly puts down his left hand close to the left leg facing the fingers away from the body, towards the left. Next, the left leg is swung around as hard as possible while doing a jump. The breaker is prepared to put down the right hand. All of the breaker's weight shifts to the right arm, and he/she kicks the left leg up as high as possible. The right leg swings under the left and then the left hand comes down in front, such that both hands are now in front. Arching his/her back and without touching the ground, the breaker kicks the right leg up again and swings the left leg around low for another rotation.

A progression for this move would be double leg circles on a mushroom (similar to a pommel horse but rounded and lower down). This consists of his/her legs rotating around the mushroom 360 degrees elevated roughly 40 cm off the floor with nothing but his/her hands touching the mushroom.

Variations
There are several flare variants:
Elbow Flares - The forearms (and thus the elbows) are used to support the body rather than the hands. Due to the low clearance of the legs this is a difficult variation.
Lotus flares - A flare with the legs in lotus position.
Half-Flares - Similar to Lotus flares, except the continuous swinging motion is performed in a figure-four position instead of a "V" position.
New Yorker Flares/Atomic Flares/Power Flares - starts with the opposite hand than a standard flare normally would be started with. For example, if the legs are going to the right then the flares will start with the right hand placed on the ground first.
Chair Flares - a flare done exaggeratedly so the swinging motion to the front looks like an air chair freeze.
Double Chair Flares - a chair flare done with two airchair freezes (two bent arms), and no hops between the arm switch.
Circles/Virgin Flares - The legs stay together and straight. In gymnastics, it is referred to as a circle and is considered the prerequisite for a flare.
Hopping Flares/King Flares - Hopping on the available (load bearing) hand as the legs swing through from the front to the back. C-zeching is required for this move. The breaker must c-zech along with the hop in order to position himself properly to continue doing the flare. The term c-zech means the movement that makes one turn in the opposite way one is going during the flare. For example, if one is flaring CW, he c-zechs the flare so his body will face a bit more left after each flare round. In gymnastics, a c-zech is called a spindle.
Threaded flares - A unique flare motion where one uses the supporting arm (prior to supporting the swinging motion) to thread the two legs together. The legs become free as they swing through the front flare motion (Bboy Lilou the first who had done this move).
V-flares - An advanced flare style where the legs stay straight in a V-shape close to the body and all momentum is exerted from the hips, as the legs stays to unmoving and provides no basis of support. These are also known as 'piked flares'. Much effort is needed to master V-flares.
British flares- A flare which comes from a handstand position (placing one hand on the ground you kick the opposite foot into the air letting it catch momentum then you kick it through, the other foot you kick when you are coming down to let it pass under. Its used when coming from Air tracks to flares.
Solar flares- A flare with the hips very high in the air and the legs piked together over the front torso (as if, the legs are flaring over the bboy/bgirls's head and body). After switching from the starting arm to the opposite arm and when the torso is facing the ground, the hip pops out from under, giving the feel of the sun's explosive solar flare. It looks very similar to an airflare and a chair flare combined, but without the hop between the arm switch.

Airflares

The Airflare, sometimes also called an Airtrack, is an advanced move that is similar in concept to a Halo, also known as Headtracks or just tracks. This is because they share the feel when it comes to piking your legs and swinging them in between the hand switch. While performing an Air Flare, the breaker is inverted with his torso at a 45 degree angle to the floor. (angle can differ. the smaller the angle, the greater the difficulty). his legs in a V-shape, and his arms straight. The hands are the only body part that touch the floor as the move is being performed. The bboy/bgirl whips their legs, then arms around so that he travels in a circular path. Air Flares can also be referred to as Air Tracks: however, Air Tracks was originally a single 360 spin in the air that would be a transition move linking to another. Later, people would start doing Air flares in the manner of a continuous Air track, rendering both names to be basically the same move, since the difference in execution is so minimal. (Air flares reach across the chest and Air tracks reach over the head - the inclination of the body is irrelevant in this case.)

Variations
There are many variations of the air flare. Some notable examples include:

Elbow Air Flares/Elbow Tracks - Using your elbows instead of your hands
Bent Leg Air Flares - One leg is constantly bent during the entire movement. Bboy Blond and Bboy The End are known for using this technique.
Hopping Air Flares - Both hands never touch the floor at the same time. A hopping motion is used to continuously hop from one hand to the other. The legs are sometimes bent in this variation in order to generate the hopping effect.
Tombstone Air Flares - The legs are closed and straight during the airborne phase of the movement
Lotus Air Flares - Same as a regular air flare but with the legs in lotus position
Toe Touching Air Flares - When one hand is on the ground, the other is used to touch the toes of either foot.
Clapping Air Flares - clapping both hands in a handstand between airflares
Munching Air Flares - The "munch" effect can be achieved by positioning the legs in munch-mill position in mid-flight. In a more advanced variation the bboy/bgirl keeps their legs in this position even when the hands are touching the floor.
Threaded Air Flares - bringing a leg through a loop created by the other leg and the non-supporting hand
Walking Air Flares - At least one hand is always in contact with the floor, even during the airborne phase of a regular Air Flare. This variation requires great flexibility in the shoulders.
One-handed Air Flares - A very difficult variation of airflare. The same swinging hand turns a full swing with only one hand at 180 degrees. Famous done by Bboy Punisher, Bboy Clil and so on... 
Airflare 1.5 (a.k.a. Airflare Bombs, Airflare suicides) - The body rotates 540 degrees and the bboy/bgirl lands on their back rather than on their hands.

Sequence
Four rotations of the chair flares:

References

External links
BBC Blast - Dance Watch Lil' Tim demonstrate flares in this downloadable video clip from BBC Blast.
Six flares
Three miniflares

Breakdance moves